The Mills County Courthouse is located in Glenwood, Iowa, United States. It is the second building the county has used for a courthouse and county business.

History
Glenwood was named the county seat when Mills County was organized in 1851, but it was called Coonville at the time. The first courthouse was a two-story brick structure with a tin roof that was completed in 1857. It measured . County offices were located on the main floor and the courtroom with its  ceiling was located on the second floor. The courtroom was used for various public events in addition to court sessions. In 1910 an addition was built by W.S. Doan.

The present courthouse was begun in 1958 and completed the following year for $319,038.09. It is a two-story concrete and glass structure designed by B.H. Backlund and Associates and built by Butler Construction Co. The main entrance is in a small glass-enclosed portico. Colored panels are located between the windows. A metal hipped roof and roof dormers have subsequently been added to the building giving it more of a Post-modern appearance. A Modernist concrete clock tower is located next to the building.

References

Government buildings completed in 1959
Modernist architecture in Iowa
County courthouses in Iowa
Buildings and structures in Mills County, Iowa
1959 establishments in Iowa